Gary Allison is a retired German-born American soccer player. This outstanding  goalkeeper played professionally, for 12 years,  from 1973-1984, in the NASL (North American Soccer League), ASL(American Soccer League) and MISL( Major Indoor Soccer League) after attending Westmont College (1969-1972) in Santa Barbara, Ca.

Allison was born in 1951 in Munich, Germany but raised in Fuerstenfeldbruck.  In 1960, he was adopted by an American
military family and became a US citizen. He attended Bitburg H.S. in Germany (received All-Conference award for Europe) and graduated in 1969  from Wasson H.S. in Colorado Springs, Co.  He attended Westmont College where he helped
guide the Warriors to a National Championship (NAIA) in 1972.

College
Allison attended and played 4 yrs. at Westmont College, in Santa Barbara, Ca. His stellar intercollegiate career was capped in 1972 when he was named MVP of the national tournament in winning the National Championship. Subsequently, he was chosen to the first ever Senior Bowl (he was the starting keeper for the West Squad), and named runner-up for Soccer Player of the Year honors. Additionally he was nominated for All-America honors, All-West Coast –all 4 years, and twice to the NAIA all-tournament team. He was named, twice, as Santa Barbara outstanding soccer player, in ’71 and ’72.  His collegiate career was capped by being inducted into the NAIA Hall of Fame in 1986. In 1973, he was drafted by the Dallas Tornado of the NASL.

Professional
In 1973, he signed with the Dallas Tornado of the North American Soccer League.  He played in only several games(international) over two seasons.  In 1975, he was traded to the Los Angeles Aztecs in return for 8 players. He achieved the starters role until an injury cut his season short. After a lengthy recovery, he joined the Sacramento Spirits (in the American Soccer League)where he played in 1976-1977 . In 1977, he led the league with the lowest goals against average and was named to the All-Star team.  In 1978, he returned to the NASL to play for the San Diego Sockers and saw limited action due to injuries.  In 1979, he joined the MISL (Major Indoor Soccer League)where he would play a single season each year, before injuries knocked him out of  the starting roles  in Cleveland Force, Chicago Horizon, Pittsburgh Spirit, Los Angeles Lazers and Buffalo Stallions, and finally a career-ending injury in Buffalo in 1984. He was a unanimous selection to the MISL All-Star team in 1981 while playing for the Chicago Horizon. He retired in 1984 due to an injury after 12 years in the pro's.

Business
Allison is now retired having served as General Manager of Ronal Wheels USA, for 15 years. He has a 16-year-old daughter, Cynthia ; and a 2-year-old daughter, Stella. He resides in Southern California.

References

External links
NASL/MISL stats

1952 births
American soccer players
American Soccer League (1933–1983) players
Chicago Horizons players
Cleveland Force (original MISL) players
Dallas Tornado players
Association football goalkeepers
German emigrants to the United States
Living people
Los Angeles Aztecs players
Los Angeles Lazers players
Major Indoor Soccer League (1978–1992) players
North American Soccer League (1968–1984) indoor players
Pittsburgh Spirit players
Sacramento Gold (1976–1980) players
San Diego Sockers (NASL) players
Westmont Warriors men's soccer players
Footballers from Munich